The Bishop of St Edmundsbury and Ipswich is the Ordinary of the Church of England's Diocese of St Edmundsbury and Ipswich in the Province of Canterbury.

The current bishop is Martin Seeley. The Bishop's residence is the Bishop's House, Ipswich — a little to the north of the town centre.

History
Under the Suffragan Bishops Act 1534, the title Bishop of Ipswich was created in 1536, but it fell into abeyance following the first holder surrendering the office in 1538. In 1899, the title was revived with two suffragan bishops of Ipswich appointed to assist the diocesan bishop of Norwich. Through reorganisation in the Church of England, the Diocese of Saint Edmundsbury and Ipswich was established by Act of Parliament in 1913 under King George V. The bishop's and the diocesan offices are located in Ipswich, while the bishop's seat is located at St Edmundsbury Cathedral in Bury St Edmunds. Since 1934, the bishops of St Edmundsbury and Ipswich have been assisted by the suffragan bishops of Dunwich in overseeing the diocese.

List of bishops

Assistant bishops
Among those who have served the diocese as assistant bishops have been:
in 1921, Cecil Wood, Rector of Witnesham and former Bishop of Melanesia, served as archbishop's commissary (i.e. acting diocesan bishop)
1931–1934: Maxwell Maxwell-Gumbleton, Archdeacon of Sudbury from 1932 and former Bishop of Ballarat, became first Bishop suffragan of Dunwich

References

Bibliography

 
 

Saint Edmundsbury and Ipswich
 
Bishops of St Edmundsbury and Ipswich
Diocese of St Edmundsbury and Ipswich